The Marshall Thundering Herd football statistical leaders are individual statistical leaders of the Marshall Thundering Herd football program in various categories, including passing, rushing, receiving, total offense, defensive stats, and kicking. Within those areas, the lists identify single-game, single-season, and career leaders. The Thundering Herd represent Marshall University in the NCAA Division I FBS Sun Belt Conference.

Although Marshall began competing in intercollegiate football in 1895, the school's official record book considers the "modern era" to have begun in 1950. Records from before this year are often incomplete and inconsistent, and they are generally not included in these lists.

These lists are dominated by more recent players for several reasons:
 Since 1950, seasons have increased from 10 games to 11 and then 12 games in length.
 With the exception of the World War II years, freshmen were not allowed to play until the 1971 season in the aftermath of the crash of Southern Airways Flight 932. The NCAA allowed freshmen at all schools to start playing in 1972.
 Bowl games only began counting toward single-season and career statistics in 2002. The Thundering Herd have played in seven bowl games since this decision, giving many recent players an extra game to accumulate statistics.
 Although bowl games were not counted toward single-season and career statistics until 2002, games in NCAA championship tournaments have always been included. This is relevant because Marshall had a very successful tenure in Division I-AA, now known as the Football Championship Subdivision. When Marshall first played at the I-AA level in 1982, the tournament involved 12 teams; it expanded to 16 teams in 1986, remaining at that size through Marshall's final I-AA season in 1996. The Herd were regularly involved in the division's championship tournament, advancing to the championship game seven times and winning it twice. Several single-season records date from this era.

These lists are updated through the end of the 2020 season.

Passing

Passing yards

Passing touchdowns

Rushing
Complete yardage totals for Jackie Hunt and John Zontini are not available because such specific statistics were not always kept back then. However, the Marshall record book estimates career totals for them and includes them in the official career rushing yards list.

Rushing yards

Rushing touchdowns

Receiving

Receptions

Receiving yards

Receiving touchdowns

Total offense
Total offense is the sum of passing and rushing statistics. It does not include receiving or returns.

Total offense yards

Touchdowns responsible for
"Touchdowns responsible for" is the official NCAA term for combined passing and rushing touchdowns.

Defense

Interceptions

Tackles

Sacks

Kicking

Field goals made

References

Marshall